Roderick Cox may refer to:

Roderick Cox (conductor), African American conductor
Roderick H. Cox (1911–2000), American athlete, educator and environmentalist